Perfectionist is the debut studio album by English singer Teddy Sinclair, under the name Natalia Kills. It was released on 1 April 2011 by will.i.am Music Group, Cherrytree Records, KonLive and Interscope Records. Despite having started out as an actress, Sinclair later became a rap artist and released a single in 2005; however, her label went bankrupt. Songwriting remained her principal activity until 2008, when she was signed by will.i.am and started recording the album.

Sinclair worked with musicians including Fernando Garibay, Jeff Bhasker, and Martin Kierszenbaum, and created a concept album based on perfectionism. Its lyrical content contains references to love, sex, and money, complemented by a sonority rooted in electropop and synth-pop. Perfectionist received mixed reviews from music critics, who asserted that the singer's visual projects were superior to her music. The album performed moderately on international record charts, reaching the top 50 in select European countries. In the United Kingdom and United States, the set attained chiefly low positions; in the latter, it had sold 14,000 copies as of September 2013.

The album spawned four singles—"Mirrors", "Wonderland", "Free" and "Kill My Boyfriend"—which were generally successful in Europe and were accompanied by music videos. "Mirrors" managed to peak within the top five of the US Hot Dance Club Songs. In association with Guillaume Doubet, Kills produced a web series titled Love, Kills xx in order to promote the album, based on her secret thoughts and desires. Consisting of 10 episodes, it features Sinclair seeking revenge and hurting men.

Background

Kills was introduced to singing and dancing at the age of 3, and until she was 12, she studied in the London Academy of Music and Dramatic Art. Kills initially pursued an acting career, appearing in some TV series including All About Me and The Archers; however, in her hometown of Leeds, she developed an interest in hip hop music. She subsequently entered various rap battles, for which she started writing lyrics, and in 2003, Kills won a BBC Radio 1-sponsored "MC Battle". From there on, she began writing songs for artists and film soundtracks. Kills released her first single on 21 February 2005, titled "Don't Play Nice", under the moniker Verbalicious and with label All Around the World; it peaked at number 11 on the UK Singles Chart. She was also recording for her debut studio album, then-scheduled for an Easter 2006 release. However, the label entered bankruptcy, causing her record deal to be dissolved and the album shelved. Kills continued to work in the music industry, mainly as a songwriter with the alias of Verbz. In 2007, she relocated to Los Angeles; the next year, she lent guest vocals to French artist M. Pokora's song "They Talk Shit About Me", and changed her stage name to Natalia Cappuccini, under which she self-released an extended play (EP) titled Womannequin.

One of Kills' demos, "Shopaholic", was remixed by the Remix Artist Collective. After it was posted in American blogger Perez Hilton's blog, Kills' MySpace received a high number of views, and she reached the top of the social network's unsigned artists chart. While shopping, she was noticed by a man due to her clothing, and gave him her website address; he subsequently introduced her to a DJ, who took Kills to the American musician will.i.am's house. In November 2008, she signed a contract with the latter's record label, then an imprint of Interscope.

Recording

Kills started to prepare material for Perfectionist after establishing her record deal with will.i.am, who served as an executive producer for the album. During the recording sessions, Kills prominently worked with producers Jeff Bhasker, Fernando Garibay, the album's second executive producer Martin Kierszenbaum, and Theron "The-Ron" Feemster. Akon and Giorgio Tuinfort co-produced "Mirrors" in collaboration with Kierszenbaum. Bhasker was responsible for the entire album's songwriting and engineering, and mixed "Zombie". Feemster and Tuinfort provided instrumentation, along with Zach Kasik, Carlos Keery-Fisher and Robert Horn. More artists including Robert Horn and Tony Ugyal were commissioned for engineering.

Most of Perfectionists songs were recorded at Cherrytree Recording Studios or Enormous Studios; the latter served as the recording location for songs produced by Bhasker. "Break You Hard" and "Superficial" were produced at the American Dream, while "Wonderland" was produced at that studio and at The Hive. Kills recorded "Love Is a Suicide" and "Broke" at Paradise Studios, "Mirrors" at Chalice Recording Studios, and "If I Was God" at The Boom Boom Room.

Kills described working with will.i.am, "[...] it's almost difficult having a normal conversation with him because he's firing out ideas all the time. [...] His entire life revolves around creativity, and that's something I could really relate to." Kierszenbaum praised Kills' work ethic during the recording sessions, stating that she would focus simultaneously on the melodic and lyrical structure of song, as well as its soundscape. He went on to say that she "influenced the timbre of the sound" and assisted the production as if "she's making a movie."

Composition

Perfectionist is a concept album which focusses on how perfectionism influences Kills. "All the songs revolve around my ambition, celebrations, frustration and disappointments of being a perfectionist", she stated. "I think we're all perfectionists – we're all looking for the best to fulfil our ideologies and dreams." Kills was also inspired by "women's obsession" with fashion in general. She described the album's sound as "dark pop" due to its "opinionated" and "confrontational" lyrics which, according to her, differ from mainstream music. The lyrical content is occasionally comical and uses metaphors frequently.

Perfectionist is an electropop and synth-pop album, characterised by "driving rhythm sections and edgy minor-key melodies". Its opening track, "Perfection", runs for thirty seconds and sees a "robotic-sounding" therapist listing Kills' flaws. "Wonderland", which fantasises about romance and a relationship's "perfect ending", includes synthesizer arrangements and choir sections; the line "Take me to wonderland" is repeated throughout the song. A track including a bassline, piano, club beats and synths, "Free" samples "Wuthering Heights" by Kate Bush. It was written by Kills when she worked as a waitress, and discusses "bailing on a budget". "Break You Hard" is an industrial pop song with "hypnotic rhythms", which talks about "breaking a lover", while "Zombie" incorporates electronic organs and "mumbling bass" in an electronic R&B sound.

"Love Is a Suicide" follows, detailing the "self-destruction" that comes with love, as Kills sings, "It's so surgical, how you dissect every mistake I make, you’re like an animal, you bite me hard". "Disco–pop" track "Mirrors" references sadomasochist sexual practices, while portraying Kills with a dominatrix-like persona; it contains electric guitars, and a bassline which Robert Copsey from Digital Spy compared to that of Eurythmics' "Sweet Dreams (Are Made of This)". The song's chorus features Kills singing in a falsetto note. Writing for Consequence of Sound, Alex Young opined that the song discusses "the duplicity of identity, hubris, and objectification". "Not in Love" is styled in electronica and influenced by acid house. AllMusic writer Jon O'Brien wrote that it "provides a welcome respite from the album's constant floor-filling leanings".

On "Acid Annie", Kills plots a revenge on an ex-boyfriend, while on the synthpop track "Superficial", she confronts her "consumptive impulses" and appreciation of "finer things." "Broke" sees Kills talking about money; "Nothing Lasts Forever" is a duet with Bhasker, who performs under the alias of Billy Kraven. It was noted by O'Connor for its prominent use of Auto-Tune. Perfectionist closes with "If I Was God", in which Kills asks her partner if he would love her if she were poor. For musicOMH, Blair Kelly likened its chorus' melody to that of Bush's "Running Up That Hill".

Release and promotion
The cover art for Perfectionist, which depicts Kills sitting on an exam chair, with a red cross covering her eyes, was unveiled by Cherrytree on 11 March 2011. In Austria, Germany and Switzerland, the album was released by Universal Music as a CD and digital download on 1 April, while in Poland it was issued on 14 April. The US release proceeded on 16 August, as well as for Canada. That day, Kills performed songs from the album at the New York City-based building Atlas, accompanied by a keyboardist. On 19 September, it was released in the United Kingdom.

Singles and music videos
"Zombie" was selected as Perfectionists first promotional single, and was released on 21 December 2009. Its music video, which features Kills being tortured in a laboratory, was released on 16 March of the following year. The song was used in the sixth episode of the first season of the Syfy reality television series Face Off, aired 2 March 2011. Despite not having been included in the album, "Activate My Heart" was released as its second promotional single on 13 April 2010, while an accompanying visual was uploaded on 17 December.

"Mirrors" was digitally released as the album's lead single on 10 August 2010, while a CD single was issued six months later in Germany. An accompanying music video was released on 1 December 2010, featuring Kills being dragged into a mirror and subsequently exploring the concepts of vanity, control and sex. The song charted. "Wonderland" followed as the second single from Perfectionist, and was available for purchase on 25 April 2011. It only charted in Austria and Germany, respectively at number 55 and 45. Doubet was commissioned to direct its music video, which sees Kills being forced into a mansion, being fed a cooked heart and ultimately climbing up a table, leading to chaos and violence inside the house.

Selected as the album's third single, a remix of "Free" with guest vocals from will.i.am, was released on 24 June 2011, with an accompanying visual being released ten days later. It obtained top 20 positions in Germany and Austria. A video for "Kill My Boyfriend" was released on 10 January 2012. It was filmed in France, and depicts Kills attempting to murder her boyfriend by drowning him in a tub of milk. Despite not having been released as a single, it peaked at number 19 on the Flanders Ultratip chart.

Love, Kills xx
To promote the album, a web series titled Love, Kills xx was written, produced and directed by Kills and Guillaume Doubet. The episodes feature the former as their protagonist; Akon, Far East Movement and Colette Carr appear as guests. According to Kills, the series are mostly devoid of dialogue in order to center on "emotion and action". She also said that the visuals were an "expression" of her secret thoughts, regrets and desires. Each episode contains an instrumental of a song from Perfectionist, and most videos contain narration from Kills.

The first episode starts with Kills furiously walking with a revolver in direction of a blonde man; she later ties him up on a bed, as he screams and tries to resist. Kills calls a friend whose name is not revealed, and asks him for help. During the second episode, Kills assassinates another man and takes his photograph; the next episode, she is arrested by a group—played by Far East Movement—who threaten her. She manages to strangle the leader of the group, and later leaves a message for her anonymous friend, warning him that her face is being distributed on wanted posters.

The fourth episode begins with Kills and a man involving in sexual activity. By the morning, the latter wakes up while Kills is asleep, and steals her passport and revolver. Kills is surprised to see that he has left and gets angry after realizing that she was robbed. During the 1970s exploitation film-inspired fifth episode, a victim of Kills denounces her to a detective, revealing that she left him in a desert. In the following episode, Kills runs over the man who robbed her two episodes earlier, with her convertible, and retrieves her passport. As the seventh webisode begins, Kills argues with her new boyfriend, who slaps her. Kills meets with him a week later, telling him that she's not angry, however she hits him with a baseball bat.

In the eighth episode, set in a hotel, Kills wins a checkers game between her and a man—played by Akon—who carries a black box; she exits the hotel carrying the box. The box, which contains a list of men names, is opened by Kills during the penultimate episode. She takes the list and crosses the name "Jeremy" off it. The camera shifts to a field where Kills makes a man jump from a cliff, by playing a game of "cold, warm and hot" with him. The last episode sees Kills and a friend of hers—interpreted by Carr—burning the car of the latter's boyfriend.

Tour
To further promote the album, Kills went on a 58-date promotional tour, starting from 24 June 2011 and concluding on 22 November 2011.

Tour dates

 A ^ Marked dates supporting The Black Eyed Peas on their The Beginning Massive Stadium Tour.
 B ^ This concert was a part of the Glastonbury Festival 2011.
 C ^ This concert was a part of the Wireless Festival 2011.
 D ^ Marked dates supporting Kesha on her Get Sleazy Tour.
 E ^ Marked dates supporting Katy Perry on her California Dreams Tour.
 F ^ Marked dates supporting The Sounds on their 2011 tour.

Reception

Upon release, Perfectionist received mixed reviews from music critics. Jon O'Brien from AllMusic summarised it as "formulaic and gimmicky", and observed that the music was secondary to Kills' attempts of establishing a mature image. AltSounds staff member Jack Stevin deemed it "disappointing" and unfocused, writing that Kills was not in control of the album and that she had an "air of pretension around" her. Stevin additionally said that Kills was stronger as a "visual artist". Darryl Sterdan of Canoe.ca rated Perfectionist with three out of five points. Comparing it to the music of Lady Gaga, Kesha and Robyn, he opined, "Guess that's why it's not called Innovator." Writing for Consequence of Sound, Alex Young noted that Kills expressed herself better as a musician through music videos, and surmised that "not all the songs on Perfectionist hit their mark". Digital Spy's Lewis Corner described it as "finely tailored" and "exciting", and gave it four stars out of five. musicOMH writer Blair Kelly characterised the album as imperfect, "uninspired, unoriginal and obvious" while negatively comparing it to the works of American singer Lady Gaga.

In Europe, the album achieved moderate chart success. On the chart issue dated 1 October 2011, it entered the UK Albums Chart at number 129. In Austria and Canada, the album respectively reached number 35 and 36, while on the German and Swiss charts, it peaked at numbers 50 and 94. Perfectionist managed to top the US Heatseekers Albums chart and reach number six on the Dance/Electronic Albums chart, despite entering the main Billboard 200 chart at number 134. By August 2013, it had sold 14,000 copies in the United States. In Canada, the album reached number 36. Kills credited the success of the album and its singles with changing her life, commenting, "I had nowhere to live, [...] got on a plane to LA and then two years later I had sold over 800,000 singles. I wrote 14 songs and that's what happened? [...] I would never have thought this. I would have probably thought I was dead by now."

Kills discussed Perfectionist during 2013 interviews. She revealed that after having lived a deplorable life in London, her ambitions and dreams influenced the album's lyrics. "I was not as aware of... how I was", she stated. "I almost had a bit of fear where everybody wants to be loved, everybody wants to be understood in a way that's not full of judgment or blame. So I put all of myself into the album and then [kept] bits out." That year, Corner hailed Perfectionist as "one of the most underrated pop collections in recent memory", and Idolator's Sam Lansky opined that although it had "killer" choruses, the album suffered from excessive similarities to other artists.

Track listing

Notes
  signifies a co-producer
  signifies a vocal producer

Personnel
Credits adapted from the liner notes of Perfectionist.

Musicians

 Natalia Kills – vocals
 Dr. Orton – voice 
 Robert Horn – guitars 
 "The-Ron" Feemster – guitars ; all other instruments ; background vocals 
 Carlos Keery-Fisher – guitars 
 Zach Kasik – guitars 
 Giorgio Tuinfort – all instruments 
 Martin "Cherry Cherry Boom Boom" Kierszenbaum – all instruments ; background vocals 
 Heather Kierszenbaum – 911 operator 
 Jeff Bhasker – vocals 
 Christopher Simila – background vocals 
 Kristle Simila – background vocals

Technical

 Martin "Cherry Cherry Boom Boom" Kierszenbaum – production ; recording ; vocal production ; executive production
 Robert Orton – mixing ; vocal production 
 "The-Ron" Feemster – production 
 Zach Kasik – recording 
 Robert Horn – recording 
 Jeff Bhasker – production, recording ; mixing 
 Dion "No I.D." Wilson – co-production 
 Anthony Kilhoffer – recording 
 Fernando Garibay – production, recording 
 Akon – production 
 Giorgio Tuinfort – production 
 Mark "Exit" Goodchild – recording 
 Tony Ugyal – recording ; vocal production 
 Gene Grimaldi – mastering
 will.i.am – executive production

Artwork
 Lauren Dukoff – photography
 Julian Peploe Studio – art direction, design

Charts

Release history

Notes

References

2011 debut albums
Albums produced by Akon
Albums produced by Fernando Garibay
Albums produced by Jeff Bhasker
Albums produced by Theron Feemster
Cherrytree Records albums
Concept albums
Interscope Geffen A&M Records albums
Interscope Records albums
KonLive Distribution albums
Natalia Kills albums
Polydor Records albums